The Church of La Compañía is one of the many churches located in the Historic Center of Arequipa. It is located between the Portal de la Municipalidad and the Portal de Flores. Temple erected by the Society of Jesus in the Peruvian city of Arequipa, it is one of the most outstanding examples of the so-called Andean Baroque.

Inside the temple you can see carved wooden altarpieces covered with gold leaf. In the sacristy is the Chapel of San Ignacio, with polychrome murals showing tropical flora and fauna. The cloisters were built in the 18th century.

This is part of the UNESCO World Heritage Site "Historical Centre of the City of Arequipa".

History

On August 17, 1578, based on 20,000 ducats donated by Diego Fernández Hidalgo, the construction of the Jesuit College of Arequipa began. The church only began to rise in the year 1595. It was under the direction of brother Felipe and was completed in 1698.

As in other buildings in the city, the material for its construction comes from the tuff quarries of Arequipa. The physical properties of this volcanic rock make it a very easy stone to carve, but it makes carving difficult in depth due to its porous texture. This gave rise to the development of a type of superficial decoration that, as in the case of La Compañía church, goes beyond the limits of the portal and partially covers the rest of the wall, forming a large stone tapestry.

The side portal was built in 1654, and the main facade built in 1698, show carved flowers, spirals, birds and angels with Indian and white faces, it has a polychrome cupola and 66 canvases from Cusco School, including original 17th century oil paintings by Bernardo Bitti.

The vaults of this church were not completed until 1690. According to a chronicler of the colony that "the layout of the church is very good and very repaired of stirrups against earthquakes".

The expatriation of the Jesuits from Arequipa took place on September 17, 1767.

Architecture

It has a Latin cross floor plan and consists of three naves, deep side chapels, a crossing and a dome on pendentives. The temple and the façade, like the rest of the colonial monuments in the city of Arequipa, are made of tuff stone, which is porous, very white, very easy to carve and the one that is best suited for ornamental work.

The main facade, in Andean Baroque style, stands out as one of the masterpieces —head of the series— of South American colonial decoration. It is distinguished by treating the relief on the surface and not in depth. The main facade of the church was rebuilt in 1698 after an earthquake.

Although it belongs to the second half of the 17th century, its influence extends throughout the 18th century, not only in Arequipa, but also in the Peruvian territory. The novelty that begins with this planiform decoration is to use native American elements, plants, animals and resurrected subjects from pre-Columbian mythology mixed with European motifs, which cover the façade with true horror of emptiness.

Inside, the main altar stands out, one of the most beautiful in Arequipa, which boasts in the central part one of the best paintings, "The Virgin with the Child", by the Italian painter Bernardo Bitti, who arrived in Peru in 1575.

A pulpit elaborately carved in fine wood overgilded in gold leaf, shows a fine carving that looks like gold filigree, on the sill and the tornavoz.

The high altar in baroque style is monumental, all in gold leaf. In its niches it houses images of saints such as St. Ignatius of Loyola, founder of the Company, St. Francis Borgia, Duke of Gandia and Grandee of Spain. On this altar there is also an image of the heart of Jesus.

The dome of the Church of La Compañia is one of the most beautiful Arequipa creations. On a square floor, the tholobate rises with small lighting windows on the axes, on which the conise is curved; in the angles, on the pendentives, the typical counterpoint pinnacles take the form of small temples with oblique domed cupolas reproduce on a smaller scale, in the finials crowned by pyramidal pinnacles. The semicircular dome has a geometric decoration reminiscent of the Low Renaissance.

Of the rest of the building, it is worth highlighting the side portal and the two cloisters, also covered by a rich stone decoration.

Gallery

See also
List of colonial buildings in Arequipa

References

Roman Catholic churches in Arequipa
Roman Catholic churches completed in 1698
1578 establishments in the Spanish Empire
Andean Baroque architecture in Peru
Jesuit churches

es:Iglesia de la Compañía (Arequipa)